Ramskapelle may refer to:

 Ramskapelle, Knokke-Heist, a village in Knokke-Heist, Belgium
 Ramskapelle, Nieuwpoort, a village in Nieuwpoort, Belgium